Champion is an unincorporated community in the town of Green Bay in Brown County, Wisconsin, United States. It is part of the Green Bay Metropolitan Statistical Area. The town hall for the town of Green Bay is located in Champion and the National Shrine of Our Lady of Good Help is located just east of Champion.

History
The area was called "Grez-Daems", from 1853 to 1862 after the Belgian Priest Father Daems, who is credited with being the founder of the Belgian Colony in Wisconsin. In 1862, the community became known as "Aux Premiers Belges" (The First Belgians). The same area was also known as Robinsonville, after Charles D. Robinson, editor of the Green Bay Advocate, an early newspaper started in 1846. The name Robinsonville was given prominence by Adele Brice’s apparitions of the Blessed Virgin Mary in 1858 which is now the site of Our Lady of Good Help Chapel in Robinsonville.  

When the post office moved to the store and tavern of Mr. Delvaux to be more centrally located, Mr. Delvaux, he didn’t want the office named after him. The suggestion of Champion was from Sister Adele Brise, because it was the name of a little village near Wavre in Belgium where she had planned to join the convent in sisterhood before her parents immigrated.

Images

Notable people
Grégoire Dupont, legislator
Peter Pernin, Catholic pastor (1868-9) and Peshtigo fire memoirist

References

Unincorporated communities in Brown County, Wisconsin
Unincorporated communities in Wisconsin
Green Bay metropolitan area